The Barra do Una Sustainable Development Reserve is a  sustainable development reserve (RDS) in the state of São Paulo, Brazil.

Location

The Barra do Una Sustainable Development Reserve is divided between the municipalities of Peruíbe (91.05%) and Iguape (8.95%) in São Paulo state.
The RDS is on the coast at the mouth of the Una do Prelado River.
The Juréia-Itatins Ecological Station is to the southwest and the Itinguçu State Park is to the northeast.
The Ilha do Ameixal Area of Relevant Ecological Interest covers an island in the river just upstream from its mouth.

History

The RDS was create by state law 12.406 of 12 December 2006 from part of the Juréia-Itatins Ecological Station, including the village of Barra do Una, part of the Una do Prelado River and part of the coastal waters.
Law 12.406 was declared unconstitutional on 11 September 2007, and this was confirmed on 25 June 2009.
Law 14982 again created the RDS and other conservation units from part of the Juréia-Itatins Ecological Station.
The new units and the ecological station were included in the Juréia-Itatins Mosaic.

Tourism

The Associação Amigos de Bairro da Vila Barra do Uma (Association of Friends of the Bairro of Vila Barra do Una) was founded in 2002 and consists of 45 families of traditional inhabitants with about 120 people.
It aims to improve the quality of life of the community in a way that is harmonious and integrated with environmental conservation.
It sponsors the Community Sustainable Tourism Project of the RDS, which had the aim of consolidating and organizing tourism in the RDS.
The beach is used for activities related to ecotourism such as walking, hiking, mountain biking and jeep tours.
The RDS holds the ruins of a 16th-century Jesuit church.
The villagers preserve many of the caiçaras festivals, traditions and costumes. 
The RDS has hostels and camping areas, bars, restaurants, grocery stores and a small marina.

Notes

Sources

2006 establishments in Brazil
Sustainable development reserves of Brazil
Protected areas of São Paulo (state)